Parlier may refer to:
 Parlier, California, city in Fresno County, California
 Charles Jules Parlier (1827—1888), French general officer 
 Eugène Parlier (1929–2017), Swiss football goalkeeper
 Yves Parlier (born 1960), French sailor
 Heinrich the Parlier (died 1403), German stone mason and architect, see Heinrich Beheim